Trofarello is a comune (municipality) in the Metropolitan City of Turin in the Italian region Piedmont, located about  southeast of Turin.

Trofarello borders the following municipalities: Pecetto Torinese, Moncalieri, Cambiano, and Santena.

Twin towns — sister cities
Trofarello is twinned with:

  Le Teil, France (1972)
  Raunheim, Germany (1986)

References

External links
 Official website

Cities and towns in Piedmont